The Bald Head Island Conservancy (BHIC) is a non-profit organization founded November 7, 1983. BHIC's mission is barrier island conservation, preservation and education. It is located in the Smith Island Complex in Brunswick County, North Carolina, which includes Bald Head Island, Middle and Bluff Islands, all of which are bounded by the Cape Fear River and the Atlantic Ocean.  BHIC sponsors and facilitates scientific research that benefits coastal communities and provides numerous recreational and educational activities for students, educators, visitors, and residents.  In coordination with various organizations, partnerships and collaborations, the Conservancy has led the nation in conservation and research efforts and is uniquely poised to become a leader in Barrier Island Conservation world-wide.

Preservation 
BHIC and its subsidiary, the Smith Island Land Trust, are dedicated to protecting critical habitats through conservation easements and land donations.  The Smith Island Land Trust has been instrumental in preserving 9,000 acres of land and marsh in its natural state.  Of the 2,000 acres of developable land, the Trust has preserved 347 acres and currently holds the deeds on 37 acres.

Conservation 
The Bald Head Island Conservancy employs management and restoration strategies to protect the fragile ecosystems of the Smith Island Complex.  Currently the Conservancy is involved in the research of sea turtles, vivex/invasive species, maritime forest, water quality, alligators, oysters, dunes, amphibians, deer, and painted buntings.

Sea Turtle Program 
In cooperation with the North Carolina Wildlife Resources Commission and the National Marine Fisheries Service, the Conservancy's Sea Turtle Protection Program has been in operation since 1983,. As one of NMFS's "index beaches", Bald Head Island is nationally recognized for its sea turtle nesting activity, and for the Conservancy's efforts to protect this resource. The Conservancy is the only non-government entity in North Carolina that is permitted to conduct turtle identification and satellite-tracking of sea turtles.  Saturation tagging, that is tagging every possible female, provides a census of all nesting females.  Data collected from nesting sea turtles includes GPS nest locations; flipper tag data; PIT tagging; straight and curved line carapace dimensions; and occasionally satellite tagging.

Each summer, BHIC funds and houses interns to conduct field work for the Sea Turtle Protection Program, under the direction of a sea turtle biologist. The interns are typically undergraduates majoring in natural resource related fields. The majority of the interns’ summer is spent patrolling for nesting sea turtles from dusk until dawn on an all terrain vehicle.  After the nesting female returns to the ocean, interns protect the nest from predation by burying a protective wire cage around the nest thus preventing raccoons, foxes, and dogs from disturbing the nest, while allowing the hatchlings to emerge unimpeded. Nests laid in a suboptimal location may be relocated to a safer location. Eggs may be in danger if they are laid below or close to the high tide line, in an area of high foot traffic, or of low sand quality. A nest can be relocated within the first six hours after it was laid, which is facilitated by our intensive beach patrolling.

Since the incubation time for sea turtles in our locale is approximately sixty days, the Conservancy hosts sea turtle hatching events from late July through mid-October.  After a nest has hatched, or if the nest is overdue, it will be excavated to determine nesting success. Success is determined by counting the number of eggs that successfully hatched vs. the total in the nest. This is evident by the number of empty eggs left in the nest along with the number of unhatched eggs. Frequently, viable hatchlings are rescued and released on the beach so they can make their way to the ocean.

Most of the sea turtles that visit the Smith Island Complex are loggerheads (Caretta caretta), but occasionally Atlantic green sea turtle (Chelonia mydas) will visit.  Sea turtle nesting on Bald Head Island has experienced a general downward trend over the past 25 years but through the protection efforts of the Bald Head Island Conservancy, the number of nesting females should begin increasing in the years to come.

Education 
BHIC's programs allow participants of all ages to gain hands-on knowledge about the value and vulnerability of barrier island environments.

Adventure Programs 
Guided Kayak Tours;
Turtle Walks (Participants can observe 300 lb. loggerhead sea turtles coming ashore to nest under the cover of darkness or view tiny hatchlings emerging from their nest);
Sea Turtle Patrol Ride Along;
Birding BHI;
Bald Head After Dark;
Hands on Dissections;
Movies;
Naturalist Corner;
Reptile Round-Up;
Beachcombing;
Crabbing and Cast Nesting;
Island Gators;
Salt Marsh Treks;
Island Nature Tours;
Maritime Forest Hikes;
Middle Island Ibis Lake Sanctuary Tour; and
Fishing Schools (The Conservancy has offered three fishing schools for over two decades)

Summer Camps 
The Conservancy holds camps for all ages each summer.

Barrier Island Study Center 
The BISC is the first community-based barrier island research and education facility in the nation. The building itself is LEED Gold Certified with wood salvaged from the bottom of the Cape Fear River, energy efficient lighting, and a 6,800 gallon rainwater collection system.  Due to Bald Head Island's unique environment, researchers at the BISC have access to ten miles of beaches and dunes, 10,000 acres of salt marsh, 4,000 acres of barrier island "upland" and 193 acres of preserved maritime forest. The BISC includes large classrooms, a wet and a dry laboratory, viewing rooms, and dormitories.

The BISC is affiliated with researchers from Wake Forest University, UNC-Wilmington, NC State University, Duke University, East Carolina University, and Virginia Commonwealth University.

References

External links
 Bald Head Island Conservancy - official site

Environmental organizations based in North Carolina
Education in Brunswick County, North Carolina
Buildings and structures in Brunswick County, North Carolina
Nature centers in North Carolina
1983 establishments in North Carolina